Sarah Armstrong (born 1968) is an Australian journalist and novelist. Over an eight-year period she worked for the ABC on radio programs including AM, PM and The World Today where she won a Walkley Award in 1993. In 2005, her first novel Salt Rain won the Dobbie Encouragement Award, and was shortlisted for the Miles Franklin Award and the Queensland Premier's Literary Awards.

Novels 

 Salt Rain, 2004
 His Other House, 2015
 Promise, 2016
 Big Magic'', 2022

References

External links 
 

1968 births
Living people
Australian women journalists
Australian women novelists
Journalists from New South Wales
21st-century Australian novelists
21st-century Australian women writers